The Ropičanka is a -long stream in the Moravian-Silesian Region, Czech Republic. It is a left tributary of the Olza, which it enters on the outskirts of Český Těšín. The Ropičanka flows through Řeka, Smilovice, Střítež and Ropice (from source to mouth). A small portion of its volume (about 0.07 m³/s or 2.5 ft³/s) is diverted to the watershed of the Stonávka in order to increase the flow rate at the Těrlicko Dam.

References

Rivers of the Moravian-Silesian Region
Frýdek-Místek District
Český Těšín
Cieszyn Silesia